The ITV Polaris is a French single-place, paraglider that was designed by Xavier Demoury and produced by ITV Parapentes of Épagny, Haute-Savoie. It is now out of production.

Design and development
The Polaris was designed as an intermediate glider. The models are each named for their approximate wing area in square metres.

Variants
Polaris V2 24
Small-sized model for lighter pilots. The glider model is AFNOR Standard certified.
Polaris V2 26
Mid-sized model for medium-weight pilots. The glider model is AFNOR Standard certified.
Polaris V2 28
Large-sized model for heavier pilots. The glider model is AFNOR Standard certified.

Specifications (Polaris 26)

References

Polaris
Paragliders